is a Japanese writer of crime fiction and thrillers. He is a member of the Mystery Writers of Japan.

He worked for a time under the Japanese film director Kihachi Okamoto in his youth. After that he studied film at Los Angeles City College from 1989 to 1991.

His first novel Jūsan Kaidan (literally "Thirteen Steps", 2001) is a crime fiction novel which deals with the Japanese capital punishment system.

Awards and nominations
 2001 - Edogawa Rampo Prize: Jūsan Kaidan (Thirteen Steps)
 2011 - Yamada Futaro Award: Genocide Of One
 2011 - Nominee for Naoki Prize: Genocide Of One
 2012 - The Best Japanese Crime Fiction of the Year (Kono Mystery ga Sugoi! 2012): Genocide Of One
 2012 - Mystery Writers of Japan Award for Best Novel: Genocide Of One

Bibliography

Standalone novels
  (2001)
  (2002)
   (2003)
  (2004)
  (2005; co-authored with Hitoshi Sakagami)
  (2011; translated by Philip Gabriel as Genocide Of One, Mulholland Books, 2014)

Short story collection
 , 2007

TV and film adaptations
Japanese film
 Jūsan Kaidan (2003)

Japanese TV drama
 Roku Jikango ni Kimi wa Shinu (2008)

See also

Japanese detective fiction

References
 Profile at J'Lit Books from Japan 
 Profile and the synopsis of Genocide Of One at Mulholland Books 

1964 births
Writers from Tokyo
20th-century Japanese novelists
21st-century Japanese novelists
Japanese male short story writers
Japanese mystery writers
Japanese crime fiction writers
Edogawa Rampo Prize winners
Mystery Writers of Japan Award winners
Japanese screenwriters
Living people
20th-century Japanese short story writers
21st-century Japanese short story writers
20th-century Japanese male writers
21st-century male writers